St. Nicholas Orthodox Church is a historic Eastern Orthodox church in Caribou, Minnesota, United States. It was built in 1905 by Ukrainian American immigrants. The church features an entrance tower and two onion domes atop its sanctuary and apse; the domes are both topped by crosses. The church was used for services through the 1940s and has since only been used for occasional events.

The church was added to the National Register of Historic Places in 1984.

References

Eastern Orthodox churches in Minnesota
Buildings and structures in Kittson County, Minnesota
Churches on the National Register of Historic Places in Minnesota
Churches completed in 1905
Ukrainian-American culture in Minnesota
National Register of Historic Places in Kittson County, Minnesota
1905 establishments in Minnesota